Martín Orozco Sandoval (born 25 June 1967) is a Mexican politician affiliated with the PAN, who served as the Governor of Aguascalientes from 2016 to 2022. From 2012 to 2016, he represented Aguascalientes in the Senate during the LXII and LXIII Legislatures. He also was the Municipal President of Aguascalientes, Aguascalientes from 2005 to 2007.

Life
Orozco Sandoval worked as a private accountant from 1983 to 1995 and obtained his degree in accounting from the Universidad Panamericana, Bonaterra campus, in 1996. He began his career in the PAN not long after. From 1999 to 2001, he was the secretary of social development for the city of Aguascalientes, and in 2001, he left that post to become a state deputy to the LVII Legislature of Aguascalientes. There, he was the leader of the PAN parliamentary group.

In 2005, he ran successfully for municipal president of Aguascalientes and served two years; at the same time, he served as president of the Association of Municipalities of Mexico. In 2010, he made an unsuccessful run for governor, and two years later, he was elected to the Senate for the LXII and LXIII Legislatures. In the Senate, he presided over the Federalism Commission and served on four others, including Foreign Relations/Non-Governmental Organizations, Commerce and Industrial Promotion, and Finance and Public Credit.

On February 4, 2016, Orozco left the Senate in order to pursue another bid for Governor of Aguascalientes. In a close election, Orozco Sandoval and the PAN defeated the PRI candidate, Lorena Martínez Rodríguez, by just two percentage points.

See also
 List of mayors of Aguascalientes

References

1967 births
Living people
Politicians from Jalisco
Members of the Senate of the Republic (Mexico)
National Action Party (Mexico) politicians
21st-century Mexican politicians
Governors of Aguascalientes
Municipal presidents of Aguascalientes
Members of the Congress of Aguascalientes
Panamerican University alumni